Carlos Alberto Reyes Jr. (born April 4, 1969) is a former professional baseball pitcher.

External links

1969 births
Living people
American expatriate baseball players in Canada
American expatriate baseball players in Mexico
Baseball players from Miami
Boston Red Sox players
Columbus Clippers players
Durham Bulls players
Eastern Florida State College people
Edmonton Trappers players
Florida Southern Moccasins baseball players
Greenville Braves players
Gulf Coast Braves players
Las Vegas Stars (baseball) players
Leones de Yucatán players
Macon Braves players
Major League Baseball pitchers
Modesto A's players
Oakland Athletics players
Philadelphia Phillies players
Reading Phillies players
Richmond Braves players
Sacramento River Cats players
San Diego Padres players
Tampa Bay Devil Rays players
Trenton Thunder players
Tucson Sidewinders players
American expatriate baseball players in Australia